Brigadier-General Henry Edmund Burleigh Leach, CB, CMG, CVO (18 July 1870 – 16 August 1936) was a British Army officer.

Early life and career

The son of Major-General Sir Edmund Leach of Corston House, Pembrokeshire, he was educated at Uppingham School and the Royal Military College, Sandhurst, where he won the Sword of Honour. His brother, William, was a Royal Navy officer and first-class cricketer. He was commissioned into the Northumberland Fusiliers as a second lieutenant on 2 May 1891, and was promoted to lieutenant on 8 February 1893. He was adjutant of the 4th (Volunteer) Battalion Yorkshire Regiment from 1 May 1899.

He was promoted to captain on 27 January 1900, and served with distinction as a Special Service Officer for Mounted Infantry in the Second Boer War in South Africa.  Following the end of that war in June 1902, he left Cape Town on the SS Canada returning to Southampton in late July, and was back in a regular commission with his regiment three months later. He was promoted to major in 1904, and served as Military Secretary to the Governor of Gibraltar from 1905 to 1910. In 1908 he transferred to the South Wales Borderers and in 1912 he took command of the 2nd Battalion, being promoted Lieutenant-Colonel the following year.

First World War
He took the battalion to France on 6 August 1914 following the outbreak of the First World War. On 14 October 1914 he was badly wounded at the Battle of Gheluvelt and spent the rest of the war at the Adjutant-General's Department at the War Office in London. He was appointed an Assistant Adjutant-General in 1916 and Deputy Director of Personal Services, with the rank of Brigadier-General, in 1917. He retired in 1920.

Leach was appointed Companion of the Order of St Michael and St George (CMG) in 1915, Companion of the Order of the Bath (CB) in 1919, and Commander of the Royal Victorian Order (CVO) in the 1920 New Year Honours for his organisation of the 1919 Peace March through London.

Footnotes

References
Obituary, The Times, 17 August 1936
Who Was Who

1870 births
1936 deaths
People from Pembrokeshire
People educated at Uppingham School
Graduates of the Royal Military College, Sandhurst
Royal Northumberland Fusiliers officers
South Wales Borderers officers
British Army generals of World War I
British Army personnel of the Second Boer War
Companions of the Order of the Bath
Companions of the Order of St Michael and St George
Commanders of the Royal Victorian Order
Leach family
British Army brigadiers